The First Orbán Government was the fourth democraticly elected government in Hungary after the regime change. It existed between 1998 and 2002. Its creation was made possible by the FKgP: the party withdrew 82 candidates in the second round of the election, so FKgP voters voted for the local Fidesz candidate instead, thus reversing the election result. Due to the resignations in the Parliament afterwards, the votes of the way smaller but still large number of 48 smallholder representatives were essential for the formation of the government. The governmental relationship between the two parties was formed by the coalition agreement developed by the negotiating delegations, led by László Kövér and Béla Szabadi. The coalition government consisted of three parties: Fidesz, FKgP and MDF. The latter was introduced to the Parliament with the help of Fidesz. Prime Minister Viktor Orbán took his oath of office on July 6, 1998, and his ministers took office on July 8, two days later. The coalition was dissolved in 2001, if not formally, but on its merits: the coalition agreement virtually expired. The FKgP could not even recall Imre Boros, even though the right to nominate belonged to the party. From the moment that József Torgyán, the chairman of the FKgP,  was forced to resign as a minister because of his son's so called "cassette case", although he was able to retain his position within the party, but his position weakened considerably: his party faction expelled the party chairman from the group with votes from Fidesz supporters and in violation of house rules. He assured the government of the support of five members who had previously been expelled or separated from the smallholder faction, leaving a majority in the National Assembly for a time. At the same time, the government received external support from MIÉP.

Party breakdown

Beginning of term
Party breakdown of cabinet ministers in the beginning of term:

End of term
Party breakdown of cabinet ministers in the end of term:

Composition

References

József Bölöny: Magyarország kormányai 1848–2004 (Governments of Hungary from 1848 to 2004) Az 1987–2004 közötti időszakot feldolgozta és sajtó alá rendezte Hubai László. 5. bővített és javított kiadás. (the period between 1987 and 2004 was written by László Hubai) Budapest, Akadémiai Kiadó. 2004. 

1998 establishments in Hungary
2002 disestablishments in Hungary
Cabinets established in 1998
Cabinets disestablished in 2002
Hungarian governments
Government